The 1972 U.S. Professional Indoor was a men's tennis tournament played on indoor carpet courts. It was played at the Spectrum in Philadelphia, Pennsylvania in the United States that was part of the 1972 World Championship Tennis circuit. It was the fifth edition of the tournament and was held from February 8 through February 13, 1972. Total attendance for the tournament was 57,282. First-seeded Rod Laver won the singles title, his third at the event after 1969 and 1970.

Finals

Singles

 Rod Laver defeated  Ken Rosewall 4–6, 6–2, 6–2, 6–2  
 It was Laver's 2nd singles title of the year and the 52nd of his career in the open era.

Doubles

 Arthur Ashe /  Robert Lutz defeated  John Newcombe /  Tony Roche 6–3, 6–7, 6–3
 It was Ashe's 1st title of the year and the 11th of his professional career. It was Lutz's 1st title of the year and the 7th of his professional career.

See also
 Laver–Rosewall rivalry
 1972 U.S. National Indoor Tennis Championships
 1972 National Indoor Championships

References

External links
 ITF tournament edition details

U.S. Professional Indoor
U.S. Pro Indoor
U.S. Professional Indoor
U.S. Professional Indoor
U.S. Professional Indoor